This article lists DVD ripper software capable of ripping and converting DVD discs, ISO image files or DVD folders to computer, mobile handsets and media players supported file formats.

General information 

Note: Applications with a purple background are no longer in development.

Supported software & hardware, user interface

This table lists the operating systems that different DVD rippers can run on without emulation and/or compatibility layer(s) (e.g.Wine under Linux and/or other operating systems are marked as No, mostly noted, but there may be other applications running under emulation and/or compatibility layer(s) which are not marked).  Other minimum system requirements are listed; some features (like High Definition support) may be unavailable with these specifications.

Disabling DRM

Note: As at 2009-12-10 much of the data below is based on available wiki-pages, official website pages & some limited user experience (i.e. where this table reads 'Yes' OR 'No', may be true OR may in fact need to read 'Partial', or 'Obsolete' as many encryption methods may change over time.)

Input files supported

Output files supported

References

External links
 
 

DVD rippers
DVD ripper software